Osman Denizci (born 13 October 1957) is a Turkish former football player, who played as a midfielder, and manager. He was best known for scoring the title-winning goal for Fenerbahçe in the 1982-1983 Süper Lig. He was nicknamed Delikanlı Osman (English: Osman the Sincere).

Professional career
Osman begun his footballing career with Çaykur Rizespor, and moved to Fenerbahçe on the request of his brother, Ali Kemal Denizci, who was a star of the team. In the 1982-83 season, Osman was told he would be sold in the summer of 1983 to Trabzonspor, which was Fenerbahçe's rival for the title at the time. Osman continued playing for Fenerbahçe as the season was closing and scored the Süper Lig-winning goal on the last matchday, against Bursaspor, on 10 June 1983. He won his second consecutive Süper Lig with Trabzonspor the following season.

International career
A youth international for Turkey, Osman represented the Turkey national football team three times.

Personal life
Osman's older brother, Ali Kemal Denizci, was a legendary player in the Süper Lig, who played alongside him in Fenerbahçe.

Honours
Fenerbahçe
Süper Lig (1): 1982–83
Turkish Federation Cup (1): 1982-83
Fleet Cup (1): 1983
TSYD Cup (3): 1981, 1983, 1987

Trabzonspor
Süper Lig (1): 1983-84
Turkish Federation Cup (1): 1983-84

References

External links
 
 TFF Manager Profile
 
 Mackolik Manager Profile

1957 births
Living people
Sportspeople from Trabzon
Turkish footballers
Turkey international footballers
Turkey youth international footballers
Turkish football managers
Çaykur Rizespor footballers
Trabzonspor footballers
Fenerbahçe S.K. footballers
Bursaspor footballers
Süper Lig players
Association football midfielders